Valeria Muller Ramos Bolsonaro (born in Santos on September 16, 1969) is a biologist, teacher and Brazilian deputy at the state of São Paulo. She is affiliated to Partido Liberal. She was elected in 2018.
She is an ally of Conservative president Jair Bolsonaro. She married his second cousin, leading her to adopt the surname.

References

External links 
 
 

Living people
1969 births
21st-century Brazilian women politicians
Members of the Chamber of Deputies (Brazil) from São Paulo
Liberal Party (Brazil, 2006) politicians
Brazilian anti-communists
People from Santos, São Paulo